Kaiko may refer to:

Geography
Kaiko (mountain), a mountain in the Vilcabamba mountain range in the Andes of Peru.

People
Takeshi Kaikō (1930-1989) prominent Japanese novelist
Kaiko, brother of Kaukuna Kahekili, Hawaii

Other
Kaiko GmbH video game development company located in Frankfurt, Germany
Kaikō ROV (海溝, "Ocean Trench") remotely operated underwater vehicle (ROV) built by the Japan Agency for Marine-Earth Science and Technology (JAMSTEC)
 Kaiko (ship) Kaikō Maru, spotter ship for the Japanese whaling fleet circa 2007 

Japanese-language surnames